Fremulon is an American television production company founded by television producer and writer Michael Schur. It is known for producing the long-running series Parks and Recreation, Brooklyn Nine-Nine, Master of None, and The Good Place.

History

Fremulon was founded in April 2008 by producer and writer Michael Schur. The name "Fremulon" comes from the fake insurance company that Schur's pseudonym, Ken Tremendous, worked at when he was writing for the sports blog Fire Joe Morgan. The production logo displayed at the end of Fremulon produced shows is accompanied by the word "Fremulon" spoken by actor Nick Offerman.

In March 2019, Fremulon renewed its overall deal at Universal Television.

Filmography

Current

Former

References

Mass media companies established in 2008
Television production companies of the United States